Leif Eriksen (born 14 May 1940) is a retired Norwegian football striker. He spent most of his career in Vålerenga, and became league top goalscorer in 1963. Solberg represented Norway as a U21, B and senior international.

References

1940 births
Living people
Norwegian footballers
Vålerenga Fotball players
Eidsvold TF players
Norway under-21 international footballers
Norway international footballers
Association football forwards